State Attorney Jordan (German:Staatsanwalt Jordan) is a 1919 German silent film directed by Erik Lund.

The film's art direction was by Siegfried Wroblewsky.

Cast
In alphabetical order
 Ernst Behmer 
 Ernst Laskowski 
 Eva May as Herta Hecker  
 Lina Paulsen 
 Hermann Picha 
 Heinz Stieda 
 Magnus Stifter as Staatsanwalt Jordan  
 Leopold von Ledebur 
 Emmy Wyda

References

Bibliography
 Hans-Michael Bock and Tim Bergfelder. The Concise Cinegraph: An Encyclopedia of German Cinema. Berghahn Books.

External links

1919 films
Films of the Weimar Republic
German silent feature films
Films directed by Erik Lund
German black-and-white films
Films based on German novels
1910s German films